Montu was a falcon-headed god of war in Ancient Egyptian religion.

Montu may also refer to:

Montu (roller coaster), a roller coaster at Busch Gardens Tampa
Montù, an Italian wine grape
Mõntu, a village and harbour in Estonia

See also
Montù Beccaria, a commune in Italy

Muntu